Colombage Don Udesh Sanjeewa Weerasinghe (born March 1, 1968, in Colombo), or Sanjeewa Weerasinghe, is a Sri Lankan Australian former cricketer who played in one Test in 1985.

He was picked up in Sri Lanka test squad as a schoolboy cricketer. He made his test debut against India at the P. Sara Oval in September 1985 which also historically marked Sri Lanka's first ever test win. It also remained as the first and last (only) international appearance for Sanjeewa.

Sanjeewa was educated at Isipathana College. He was the youngest test player to represent Sri Lanka at the age of 17 years and 269 days. He currently resides in Australia.

In February 2020, he was one of the Sri Lankan players to have played in a charity Bush Fire T20 match in Australia.

See also
 One-Test wonder

References

1968 births
Living people
Sri Lanka Test cricketers
Sri Lankan cricketers
Nondescripts Cricket Club cricketers
Sri Lankan emigrants to Australia
Alumni of Isipathana College